James Richard "Sandy" Sanderson (December 27, 1925 – August 10, 2010) was a United States Navy vice admiral. He was born in Selma, California, and died in Naval Medical Center Portsmouth, Portsmouth, Virginia; he had lived in Virginia Beach, Virginia, for a long time. He entered the Navy Aviation V-5 program in 1943 (some say March 1944) and retired from the Navy in April 1983.

Vice Admiral Sanderson was awarded the Legion of Merit four times, the Distinguished Service Medal, the Distinguished Flying Cross, the Meritorious Service Medal and five Air Medals.

Sanderson was an Eagle Scout and recipient of the Distinguished Eagle Scout Award from the Boy Scouts of America (BSA).  He was an active supporter of Scouting throughout his life at many levels, including helping host the annual Eagle Recognition Dinner for BSA's Tidewater Council new Eagle Scouts.

See also

List of Eagle Scouts (Boy Scouts of America)

References

External links
 Biographical info on Sanderson

United States Navy admirals
1926 births
2010 deaths
Recipients of the Air Medal
Recipients of the Distinguished Flying Cross (United States)
Recipients of the Legion of Merit
People from Selma, California
Military personnel from California